Dancethruthedawn (foaled  in Ontario) is a Canadian Thoroughbred racehorse sired by leading United States stallion Mr. Prospector from Dance Smartly, a Canadian Triple Crown Champion mare and inductee of the Canadian and U.S. Racing Hall of Fame.

The 2001 winner of the Queen's Plate, Canada's most prestigious race, Dancethruthedawn was forced to retire in October 2002 following a leg fracture suffered while competing in the Spinster Stakes. Her performances that year earned her Canadian Champion 3-Year-Old Filly honors.

In the United States, at age four, Dancethruthedawn won the Grade I Go For Wand Handicap at Belmont Park and the Doubledogdare Stakes at Keeneland Race Course.

References
 Dancethruthedawn's pedigree and stats

Thoroughbred family 23-b
Racehorses bred in Ontario
Racehorses trained in Canada
King's Plate winners
Sovereign Award winners
1998 racehorse births